Arlo Eisenberg (born 1973) is an aggressive inline skater who pioneered street skating. He is considered by many to be an important innovator of the aggressive skating industry.

Biography

Early life
Born in Dallas, Texas on September 7, 1973, Arlo spent his high school years at the Arts Magnet high school in Dallas, where he studied visual arts and theater. He discovered inline skating the summer before his senior year of high school. Arlo attended three semesters at the University of Texas at Austin before dropping out to follow his dreams West.

1992, Eisenberg moved to Venice Beach, California, where he took odd jobs before landing a position selling inline skates on The 3rd Street Promenade in Santa Monica. In 1993, together with Brooke Howard-Smith, Brian Konoske, Aaron Spohn and Mark "Heineken" Groenhuyzen, he started an inline company called Senate. Arlo was the chief graphic designer. Popular images included slit wrists and bloody baseball bats.

Arlo crafted an image of himself as a social provocateur, an image which he fostered through his artwork. As a competitive skater, he won the 1996 X Games street title as well as the 1994 NISS Championship. In 1997 Arlo's family opened Eisenbergs Skatepark in Plano, Texas where, every year, they hosted the professional skate competition, the Eisenberg's Showdown at the Hoedown. In 2012, after 15 years of success, the skate park closed down, and was leveled to be replaced with spaces for retail and lofts.

Arlo achieved widespread notoriety when Senate produced a line of T-shirts featuring tags that said ‘Destroy All Girls."  The tags, Arlo's concept, brought attention from CNN, and launched Senate into the mainstream. In 1997, Arlo was profiled in People Magazine and Newsweek named him one of their 100 Americans for the Next Century."

Post-crash
After leaving Senate in 2000, Arlo provided freelance graphic design services to many companies in the inline industry including: Salomon, Rollerblade, Xsjado, Mindgame and USD.  In 2007 Arlo was hired as a senior graphic designer for Paul Frank Industries.  Arlo was the chief graphic designer for streetwear brand "Franco Shade" since its inception in 2002.

In 2008 Franco Shade's founder, Joe Navran and Arlo agreed to split up over creative differences.  Arlo kept the "Ghost 'N Knives" logo and the "Franky" ghost cartoon character and started a new company called, "GOST" which launched in early 2009.  Franco Shade released one more season after Arlo's departure and then ceased operations.  In 2011, he designed the movie poster for "The City Never Sleeps."

Arlo Eisenberg appears in two documentaries on skating, 1999's It's All Good'''  and 2005's Barely Dead''.

Personal life 
Arlo has a daughter named Lulu. She is also the daughter of Lisa Reyes, wife of Ernie Reyes Jr.

References

External links
Arlo Eisenberg interview
Franco Shade Clothing
Eisenbergs Skatepark

 Arlo Eisenberg Be-mag Profile

1973 births
Sportspeople from Dallas
Living people
University of Texas at Austin alumni
People from Greater Los Angeles
X Games athletes
Aggressive inline skaters
American roller skaters